Ladoga is a town in Clark Township, Montgomery County, in the U.S. state of Indiana. The population was 985 at the 2010 census.

History
Ladoga was platted in 1836 by John Myers. Myers invited his friends to help him find a name. He required that the name not end in -burg or -ville and that it would not be named after another town. He chose Ladoga after finding Lake Ladoga on a map of Russia. In 1837, the town's post office was established, which still operates today.

In 1840 there were fifteen buildings in Ladoga, including two large stores selling general merchandise — one owned by Taylor Webster and one owned by William Nofsinger. By 1848, there were thirty families living in the town. The Haw Creek Academy was built two miles south of Ladoga in 1838 by the Christian Church. In 1855, the Ladoga Female Seminary was established by the Baptist Church which quickly decided to allow male students, and shortly after the Ladoga Male Academy was established which soon allowed female students. (Both decided to let in the other gender because of financial concerns.) Central Normal College was founded in Ladoga in 1876; it moved to Danville in 1878. The original building still stands in Ladoga.  Known as Normal Hall, it was listed on the National Register of Historic Places in 1996.

Ferris wheel
The town of Ladoga lays claim to the Chicago World's Fair Ferris Wheel. Designed by Pittsburgh, Pennsylvania, bridge-builder George Washington Gale Ferris Jr., Luther V. Rice of Ladoga agreed to build it. After the Chicago World's Fair it was placed in Ferris Wheel Park for a while, then moved to St. Louis, Missouri, for its World's Fair.

Geography
Ladoga is located at  (39.915223, -86.799271).

Demographics

2010 census
As of the census of 2010, there were 985 people, 377 households, and 269 families residing in the town. The racial makeup of the town was 98.4% White, 0.1% African American, 0.3% Asian, 0.3% from other races, and 0.9% from two or more races. Hispanic or Latino of any race were 1.0% of the population.

There were 377 households, of which 38.5% had children under the age of 18 living with them, 53.8% were married couples living together, 11.7% had a female householder with no husband present, 5.8% had a male householder with no wife present, and 28.6% were non-families. 22.3% of all households were made up of individuals, and 10.9% had someone living alone who was 65 years of age or older. The average household size was 2.61 and the average family size was 3.04.

The median age in the town was 36.1 years. 28.3% of residents were under the age of 18; 8.7% were between the ages of 18 and 24; 25% were from 25 to 44; 26.1% were from 45 to 64; and 11.9% were 65 years of age or older. The gender makeup of the town was 49.6% male and 50.4% female.

2000 census
As of the census of 2000, there were 1,047 people, 385 households, and 286 families residing in the town. The racial makeup of the town was 98.57% White, 0.19% African American, 0.29% Asian, 0.29% Pacific Islander, 0.29% from other races, and 0.38% from two or more races. Hispanic or Latino of any race were 0.57% of the population.

There were 385 households, out of which 37.9% had children under the age of 18 living with them, 57.9% were married couples living together, 9.9% had a female householder with no husband present, and 25.5% were non-families. 23.1% of all households were made up of individuals, and 12.2% had someone living alone who was 65 years of age or older. The average household size was 2.57 and the average family size was 2.99. In the town, the population was spread out, with 26.6% under the age of 18, 7.9% from 18 to 24, 26.9% from 25 to 44, 20.8% from 45 to 64, and 17.7% who were 65 years of age or older. The median age was 37 years. For every 100 females, there were 97.5 males. For every 100 females age 18 and over, there were 92.0 males.

The median income for a household in the town was $40,781, and the median income for a family was $43,917. Males had a median income of $31,100 versus $24,135 for females. The per capita income for the town was $16,163. About 6.4% of families and 7.7% of the population were below the poverty line, including 12.1% of those under age 18 and 8.7% of those age 65 or over.

Education
South Montgomery Community School Corporation operates public schools serving New Ross. Ladoga Elementary School is in the area. Southmont Junior High School and Southmont High School serve secondary students.

The town has a lending library, the Ladoga-Clark Township Public Library.

Notable people
 Joshua Harrison Bruce, farmer and Minnesota state legislator
 Ed Summers, baseball player, pitched in 1908 World Series

References
 Gronert, Theodore G., Sugar Creek Saga: A History and Development of Montgomery County, Wabash College, 1958.

Notes

External links
 Town of Ladoga, Indiana website

Towns in Montgomery County, Indiana
Towns in Indiana
Populated places established in 1836
1836 establishments in Indiana